Bhale Thammudu is a 1969 Indian Telugu-language action crime film co-written and directed by B. A. Subba Rao. The film stars N. T. Rama Rao and K. R. Vijaya, with music composed by T. V. Raju. It is a remake of the Hindi film China Town (1962).

Plot

The film begins with Inspector Prasad ( Mikkiilineni ) sentencing deadly gangsters of a dangerous gang, and their chief Ganapathi / Gun ( Rajanala ) wants to take revenge against him, so, he kills him and also kidnaps one of his twin sons, Ram Prasad. Ram grows up in between them by the name of Paul (N. T. Rama Rao) and becomes a daredevil gangster. Once, in a robbery, Paul was caught by police. Inspector Sekhar (Prabhakar Reddy) hides him secretly and tries to reveal the truth, out to which he refuses, even after a lot of torture. Shaam Prasad (again N. T. Rama Rao), the younger one, brought up by his mother ( Sriranjani Jr. ), is a club singer who loves Geetha (K. R. Vijaya), daughter of Rao Saheb (Relangi). Rao Saheb learns regarding their love affair, so, he takes his daughter to Hyderabad, and Shaam also follows. One night, Shaam enters Geetha's house, and Rao Saheb makes him arrested. Inspector Shekar observers the resemblance between Paul & Shaam offers him the C.I.D. job and decides to send him into their gang as Paul. Shaam tells his mother about Paul when she recognizes him as her elder son Ram Prasad and meets him, but Paul rejects her. Now Shaam gets ready to take up the job, and like Paul, he safely lands in the gang. Everyone in the gang believes him, except Paul's lover Leela (Vijaya Girija), who doubts his character and finds out the truth. Then Shaam reveals the entire story, seeks her help, and she agrees. Listening to it, Gun captures Shaam. Meanwhile, Paul's health deteriorates; while shifting to the hospital, the ambulance meets with an accident. Geeta saves him thinking as Shaam, and Paul takes her to the den when he knows the cheating of Shaam. In that anger, he starts beating him when Leela obstructs his way and reveals reality. Here Paul repents for his behavior, and Shaam consoles him. At last, both the brothers are united, see the end of Gun & his gang. Ram / Paul also surrenders and is sentenced for 6 months. Finally, Ram is released, Shaam becomes a police officer, and the movie ends on a happy note with the marriages of Ram & Leela and Shaam & Geetha.

Cast
N. T. Rama Rao as Ram Prasad (Paul) and Shyam Prasad
K. R. Vijaya as Geetha
Relangi as Rao Saheb 
Rajanala as Gun / Ganapathi 
M. Prabhakar Reddy as Inspector Sekhar
Mikkilineni as Inspector Prasad
Dr. Sivaramakrishnaiah 
Sriranjani Jr.
Vijaya Girija as Leela
Ramaprabha
Aruna Irani as an item number

Soundtrack 
The music was composed by T. V. Raju with lyrics written by C. Narayana Reddy. The song "Enthavaru Gaani" was later remixed by Sunny M.R. for Rowdy Fellow (2014).

References

1969 films
Telugu remakes of Hindi films
1960s Telugu-language films
Indian crime action films
Films directed by B. A. Subba Rao
1960s crime action films